Si Mayeli-ye Gardbisheh (also Romanized as Sī Mayelī-e Gardbīsheh; also known as Gerd Bīsheh, Gird Bisheh, Sī Māyelī, and Sīmīlī) is a village in Howmeh Rural District, in the Central District of Haftgel County, Khuzestan Province, Iran. At the 2006 census, its population was 116, in 23 families.

References 

Populated places in Haftkel County